Ali Zouaoui (November 10, 1925 – February 18, 1972) was a Tunisian economist and politician.

Career
He was a member of an old family which hailed from Hajeb El Ayoun, and studied law and economics in France. He was the chairman of Espérance Sportive de Tunis from 1968 to 1970. Then, he served as the governor of the Central Bank of Tunisia from 1970 to 1972; in the latter year he was killed in a traffic accident.

Personal life
He married Soufiya Belkhodja, sister of the painter Néjib Belkhodja and daughter of Tunisian craftsmen, then Arlette Ravalec. He had two daughters and a son. He is the grandfather of the actress, Dorra Zarrouk.

References

External links
Revue tunisienne de sciences sociales, 1967

People from Kairouan Governorate
Tunisian economists
Tunisian politicians
Road incident deaths in Tunisia
1925 births
1972 deaths
20th-century economists
Governors of the Central Bank of Tunisia
Carthage High Commercial Studies Institute alumni